Velasco Modena (17 July 1929 – 7 August 2016  ), called Vasco, was an Italian professional racing cyclist. He won the Coppa Bernocchi in 1956. He rode in the 1957 Giro d'Italia.

References

External links
Palmares by "Memoire du cyclisme"  
Résultats by Les-sports.info 
Vasco Modena o... degli anni in bicicletta  

1929 births
2016 deaths
Italian male cyclists
Sportspeople from Trentino
Cyclists from Trentino-Alto Adige/Südtirol